Lourdes Aflague "Lou" Leon Guerrero (born November 8, 1950) is a Guamanian politician who has served as the 9th governor of Guam since 2019. She was president and CEO of the Bank of Guam from 2007 to 2017, having previously served as a senator of the Guam Legislature from 1995 to 1999 and again from 2001 to 2007. She is a member of the Democratic Party.

Leon Guerrero grew up in Guam, earned a BS in Nursing from California State University in 1973 and an MPH from the University of California, Los Angeles, in 1979.

After working as a nurse in California and the Guam Memorial Hospital for several years, Leon Guerrero worked for Family Health Plan clinic and became its director of operations before her entry into public service. Leon Guerrero served as Senator in 5 separate legislative terms from 1995 to 2007. She was Senator Thomas C. Ada's running mate during the 1998 Democratic gubernatorial primary against the incumbent Gutierrez-Bordallo ticket.

Leon Guerrero left public service in 2007 to serve as president and CEO of the Bank of Guam until 2017, when she began her successful campaign for governor of Guam with running mate Josh Tenorio. Leon Guerrero has served as governor since her inauguration in 2019.

Life before public service

Early life and education
Born in Guam, Lou Leon Guerrero is the daughter of Jesus Sablan Leon Guerrero (1927–2002), founder of the Bank of Guam, and Eugenia Calvo Aflague Leon Guerrero. She has two brothers, Jesse and Anthony (1952–2005). She attended the Academy of Our Lady of Guam High School and then moved to the U.S. mainland to study and work in Southern California. Leon Guerrero earned a Bachelor of Science in Nursing at California State University, Los Angeles in 1973. She attained a Master of Public Health and at  University of California, Los Angeles in 1979. In 2009, she went back to school in Seattle, Washington to receive a masters degree from Pacific Coast Banking School.

Career
Lou Leon Guerrero worked as a staff nurse at Santa Monica Hospital in Santa Monica, California, US before returning to Guam in 1980. She worked at Guam Memorial Hospital in 1980, eventually becoming the hospital's assistant nursing director. She then went to work at the Family Health Plan clinic and served as Director of Operations (1990–1994).

In 1989, Lou Leon Guerrero, as the president of the Guam Nurses Association, provided the sole testimony from a Chamoru woman against Bill 848, a legislative measure intended to outlaw abortion on the island. In politics, Leon Guerrero served as a senator of the 23rd, 24th, 26th, 27th, and the 28th Guam Legislatures.

Legislative career

Entry to the Guam Legislature (1995–1999)

23rd Guam Legislature
Lou Leon Guerrero first ran to become senator in the Guam Legislature in 1994. Leon Guerrero advanced to the general election after having placed 9th, with 10,611 votes, in a field of 30 candidates in the Democratic Party of Guam's legislative primary election held on September 3, 1994. Leon Guerrero won election, receiving 20,168 votes and placing 9th in the general election on November 8, 1994. Leon Guerrero was inaugurated to serve in the 23rd Guam Legislature on Monday, January 2, 1995. During her first term in the Guam Legislature, Leon Guerrero was in the majority and sponsored or co-sponsored 18 public laws.

24th Guam Legislature
Lou Leon Guerrero ran for reelection into the 24th Guam Legislature in 1996. Leon Guerrero advanced to the general election after having placed 12th, with 10,185 votes, in a field of 31 candidates in the democratic primary election of September 7, 1996. She won reelection, receiving 20,050 votes and placing 8th in the general election on November 5, 1996. As a minority member of the 24th Guam Legislature, Leon Guerrero sponsored or cosponsored 6 public laws.

Return to the Guam Legislature (2001–2007)

26th Guam Legislature
Lou Leon Guerrero returned to public service in 2000, when she ran for a seat in the 26th Guam Legislature. The legislative primary election was cancelled that year, so Leon Guerrero automatically advanced to the general election held on November 7, 2000. She secured a seat in the legislature by placing 5th in the legislative general election with 18,748 votes. As a minority member of the 26th Guam Legislature, Leon Guerrero sponsored 5 public laws.

27th Guam Legislature
Lou Leon Guerrero stood for election in the 27th Guam Legislature in 2002. Leon Guerrero advanced to the general election after placing 3rd in the Democratic primary election on September 7, 2002 with 14,112 votes. Leon Guerrero placed 5th in the general election on November 5, 2002 with 23,651 votes. As a majority member of the 27th Guam Legislature, Leon Guerrero sponsored 21 public laws.

28th Guam Legislature
Lou Leon Guerrero ran for re-election into the 28th Guam Legislature in 2004. After placing fourth in the Democratic primary election on September 7, 2004 with 7,983 votes, Leon Guerrero advanced to the general election. Leon Guerrero was elected into the 28th Guam Legislature, placing 14th and garnering 14,853 votes in the general election on November 2, 2004. During this term she authored 27 bills, 9 of which became public laws. As a senator in the 28th Guam Legislature.

Legislative accomplishments
Lou Leon Guerrero authored the public law which created the Healthy Futures Fund, which currently funds medical care and cancer research in Guam. In addition, she introduced and secured the passage of the Natasha Protection Act, which regulates public smoking.

Business career
In 2007, Leon Guerrero was honored as Guam's Small Business Administration's Women in Business Champion. She then attended Pacific Coast Banking School at the University of Washington, graduating from its program in 2009. Succeeding her father and her brother, Leon Guerrero is the Chairwoman of the Board, Chief Executive Officer and President of the Bank of Guam. In August 2011, she was appointed director of the BankGuam Holding Company, and is also a director at Teleguam Holdings, LLC. Leon Guerrero was deemed Guam’s 2010 Executive of the Year by Guam Business Magazine.

Involvement in non-profit activity
Since its founding in 2009, Lou Leon Guerrero has served as Board Chair for Guampedia.
Leon Guerrero was a founding member and served as the first President of the Guam Women's Chamber of Commerce.

Elections

1998 lieutenant gubernatorial candidacy 
Incumbent Governor Carl T.C. Gutierrez and Lieutenant Governor Madeleine Z. Bordallo had two Democratic primary election challenges for Governor and Lieutenant Governor of Guam in 1998. Lou Leon Guerrero was chosen as the running mate of Senator Thomas C. Ada, and Senator Angel L.G. Santos ran with Mayor Jose "Pedo" Terlaje. The "Tom and Lou" ticket placed 2nd in the Democratic gubernatorial primary on September 5, 1998 with 9,788 votes.

2018 gubernatorial candidacy

In February 2017, former senator Leon Guerrero officially announced her bid to be the next Governor of Guam. The Bank of Guam President selected Joshua Tenorio, Vice President of Guam Auto Spot, to be her running mate in the upcoming Democratic primaries. The Leon Guerrero/Tenorio ticket faced-off with 3 other Democratic tickets: the Aguon/Limtiaco ticket, the Gutierrez/Bordallo ticket, and the Rodriguez/Cruz ticket. They emerged victorious with 32% of the primary vote. Leon Guerrero was elected as Guam's first female governor after defeating the Tenorio/Ada Ticket in the general election with 50.7% of the vote.

2022 gubernatorial candidacy

Leon Guerrero ran for reelection, with Josh Tenorio as her running mate. They got reelected with 55.49% of the vote, defeating the Camacho/Ada Ticket.

Governor of Guam (2019–present)
Lou Leon Guerrero was inaugurated on January 7, 2019, as the 9th Governor of Guam at the University of Guam Calvo Field House in Mangilao.

Policy initiatives

Minimum wage increase
Leon Guerrero expressed her support for a proposal to raise Guam's minimum wage to $9.25 in September 2019. She signed the bill increasing in the minimum wage in stages in October 2019. The first stage, increasing the minimum wage to $8.75 per hour went into effect in March 2020. A bill has since been passed and signed into law by Governor Guerrero delaying the increase in the minimum wage by 6 months, to reduce its impact to businesses during the Covid-19 Pandemic. However, the minimum wage is still set to reach $9.25 per hour in September 2021.

War claims advance payments to World War II survivors
Speaker Tina Rose Muña Barnes introduced a bill to expedite the payment of war claims to survivors of atrocities committed on Guam during World War II in July 2019. In October 2019, the Lieutenant Governor Josh Tenorio and Chief of Staff Tony Babauta visited Washington, D.C., to lobby for war claims, among other administration initiatives. Congressman Michael San Nicolas claimed that the local bill to pay war claims was a sham.

Leon Guerrero signed the war claims bill into law on January 3, 2020. The first war claims checks were distributed at a ceremony on January 29, 2020. By February, hundreds of Guam World War II survivors received their compensation through the local advance payment system.

Management of the Covid-19 Pandemic on Guam

"Path to Half" vaccination campaign
Leon Guerrero announced an ambitious "Path to Half" vaccination campaign at a press conference on March 15, 2021. She set the goal of vaccinating half of Guam's adult population by May 1. The Path to Half benchmark was met 3 days ahead of the deadline of May 1.

Personal life
Guerrero married attorney Jeff Cook. She has two children, Joaquin and Mariana, and seven grandchildren.

References

Bibliography

External links

|-

 

1950 births
20th-century American politicians
20th-century American women politicians
21st-century American politicians
21st-century American women politicians
American chief executives
American women chief executives
Bank presidents and chief executive officers
Chamorro people
Democratic Party governors of Guam
Governors of Guam
Guamanian Democrats
Guamanian women in politics
Living people
Members of the Legislature of Guam
UCLA School of Public Health alumni
University of Washington alumni
Women bankers
Women state governors of the United States